Agelena orientalis is a species of spiders  belonging to the family Agelenidae.

Description
Coloration is yellowish, with a characteristic pattern of the upperside of the abdomen. These spiders trap their preys by weaving entangling non-sticky funnel webs.

Distribution
This species is present from Italy to Central Asia and Iran.

References
 Platnick, N. I. (2007). The world spider catalog, version 7.5. American Museum of Natural History.
 On two closely related funnel-web spiders
 Spinnen Forum
 Biolib
 Fauna Europaea

Spiders of Asia
Spiders of Europe
orientalis
Spiders described in 1837